Saheki may refer to:

 Saheki (crater), impact crater on Mars
 4606 Saheki, minor planet